Arkadak is a town and the administrative center of Arkadaksky District in Saratov Oblast, Russia, located on the Bolshoy Arkadak River near its confluence with the Khopyor,  west of Saratov, the administrative center of the oblast. Population:

History
It was founded in 1721. Urban-type settlement status was granted to it in 1939; town status was granted in 1963.

Administrative and municipal status
Within the framework of administrative divisions, Arkadak serves as the administrative center of Arkadaksky District, to which it is directly subordinated. As a municipal division, the town of Arkadak, together with one rural locality (the settlement of Krasny), is incorporated within Arkadaksky Municipal District as Arkadak Urban Settlement.

Culture

The town is home to the Arkadak Museum of local history, which was established in 1968.

References

Notes

Sources

External links
Official website of Arkadak 
Directory of organizations in Arkadak 

Cities and towns in Saratov Oblast
Balashovsky Uyezd
Populated places established in 1721
1721 establishments in Russia